John Gilligan (born 28 March 1952) is a convicted Irish gangster.
He was given a 28-year prison sentence for the trafficking of commercial quantities of cannabis resin. On appeal, this sentence was reduced to 20 years, and in October 2013, he was released after serving 17 years.

Acquittal for the murder of Veronica Guerin 
In 2002, Gilligan was tried and acquitted of the murder of the investigative journalist Veronica Guerin, who was reportedly working on a tip-off from an Irish politician who was also prominent in equestrian circles. She was investigating Gilligan's involvement in the illegal hashish and marijuana trade in Ireland. After her murder, the Gardaí had more than 100 officers working on the case at one point, leading to 214 arrests, 39 convictions, and 100 confiscations of guns, £5,000,000 worth of drugs and £6,500,000 worth of property.

Gilligan's assets remained frozen by the Criminal Assets Bureau (CAB). On 30 January 2006, the High Court cleared the way for the CAB to proceed with an application to have the equestrian centre and other property that belonged to the Gilligan family handed over to the state. In January 2008, making a court appearance in an attempt to stop the state from selling off his assets, Gilligan accused John Traynor of having ordered the murder of Veronica Guerin.

After accusing the presiding judge of an attempt to silence him, Gilligan continued to blame a botched Gardaí investigation and alleged that the Gardaí had planted evidence to secure his conviction, leading to his current term of imprisonment. On 19 December 2008, Gilligan lost an appeal for a second hearing by the High Court. Because of the decision, the CAB applied to the High Court under the Proceeds of Crime Act to dispose of Gilligan's properties.

In November 2012, the courts cleared the final barriers allowing the CAB to sell off the equestrian centre and Gilligan's house at Weston Green, Lucan. In July 2014, after a lengthy challenge, a Supreme Court ruling brought the CAB one step closer to selling off the house adjoining the equestrian centre, retained by Gilligan's wife, as well as additional properties in Blanchardstown and Lucan.

Assassination attempt 
On 1 March 2014 at 7.00pm, two gunmen came to the home of Gilligan's brother and went into the house while Gilligan was using the toilet. Paramedics from the Dublin Fire Brigade and Advanced Paramedics from the National Ambulance Service arrived at the scene five minutes later with at least four confirmed hits: in his face, chest, hip and leg. He was rushed to James Connolly Memorial Hospital, where he was in a critical state. He was given the last rites as he arrived at James Connolly Memorial Hospital, in Blanchardstown, but he survived the shooting. It was reported on 14 March that the ammunition that was used to shoot him matched ammunition that had been stolen from German police a decade earlier.

His bodyguard, Stephen Douglas 'Dougie' Moran, was shot dead on 15 March 2014 in Lucan.

After the shooting of Moran, Gilligan was discharged from hospital and then left the country.

Civil forfeiture
As part of attempts to repress organised crime, including Gilligan's drug trafficking activities, Ireland introduced new civil forfeiture legislation in the wake of the murder of Guerin, the Proceeds of Crime Act, 1996. Gilligan repeatedly challenged its constitutionality in the Supreme Court of Ireland and elsewhere.

2018 arrest for money laundering 
On 23 August 2018, Gilligan was arrested as he tried to board a flight from Belfast International Airport to Spain with more than €22,000 in a suitcase. He was formally charged with attempting to remove criminal property from Northern Ireland by Antrim Magistrates' Court the following day. Following the hearing he was remanded in custody after his lawyer's application for bail was refused.

2020 arrest for drug trafficking
On 23 October 2020, Gilligan and two other men, one believed to be his son, were arrested in Spain. Spanish police seized quantities of drugs and weapons. He was released on bail in December 2020.

References

External links 
 CAB and the sale of Gilligan's horse ranch
 Gilligan wins court battle 
 High Court clears the way for CAB to dispose of Gilligan's assets (  Evening Echo, 30 January 2006)
 Gilligan loses CAB appeal

1952 births
Living people
Criminals from Dublin (city)
Irish drug traffickers
Irish crime bosses
People acquitted of murder